Kent Eugene Wells (born July 25, 1967) is a former American football defensive tackle who played one season with the New York Giants of the National Football League (NFL). He was drafted by the Washington Redskins in the sixth round of the 1990 NFL Draft. He played college football at the University of Nebraska–Lincoln and attended Lincoln East High School in Lincoln, Nebraska. Wells was also a member of the Washington Redskins, San Francisco 49ers, Ohio Glory, Cleveland Browns, Cleveland Thunderbolts, Tampa Bay Storm, Iowa Barnstormers and Orlando Predators.

College career
Wells enrolled at the University of Nebraska–Lincoln in 1985 and lettered in football for the Nebraska Cornhuskers from 1987 to 1989, recording career totals of 37 solo tackles, 40 tackle assists and ten sacks. He earned First-team All-Big Eight honors in 1989. He also participated in track and field for the Cornhuskers, competing in the shot put.

Professional career

Washington Redskins
Wells was selected by the Washington Redskins of the NFL with the 160th pick of the 1990 NFL Draft. He was released by the Redskins on August 27, 1990.

New York Giants
Wells was claimed off waivers by the New York Giants on August 30, 1990 and played in six games for the team during the 1990 season. He was released by the Giants on December 3, 1990.

San Francisco 49ers
Wells was a member of the NFL's San Francisco 49ers during the 1991 off-season. He was released by the 49ers on August 20, 1991.

Ohio Glory
Wells played in all ten games for the Ohio Glory of the World League of American Football in 1992.

Cleveland Browns
Wells was signed by the Cleveland Browns of the NFL on August 4, 1992.

Cleveland Thunderbolts
Wells signed with the Cleveland Thunderbolts of the Arena Football League (AFL) on March 19, 1993 and played for the team from 1993 to 1994. He played in the 1993 AFL All-Star game. The Thunderbolts folded after the 1994 season.

Tampa Bay Storm
Wells played for the Tampa Bay Storm of the AFL from 1995 to 1997. He earned First-team All-Arena honors in 1995 and 1996. He was also named Lineman of the Year in 1996. Wells won ArenaBowl IX and X with the Storm. He was traded to the New York CityHawks for Roosevelt Nix on June 18, 1997 but the trade was rescinded when Wells failed to pass his physical.

Iowa Barnstormers
Wells was traded to the Iowa Barnstormers in a three team deal involving the Tampa Bay Storm and New York CityHawks in 1998 and played for the Barnstormers during the 1998 season.

Orlando Predators
Wells was traded to the Orlando Predators during the 1999 preseason and played for the team during the 1999 season.

References

External links
Just Sports Stats
Fanbase profile

Living people
1967 births
American football defensive tackles
Nebraska Cornhuskers football players
Washington Redskins players
New York Giants players
San Francisco 49ers players
Ohio Glory players
Cleveland Browns players
Cleveland Thunderbolts players
Tampa Bay Storm players
Iowa Barnstormers players
Orlando Predators players
American male shot putters
Players of American football from Nebraska
Sportspeople from Lincoln, Nebraska